The 1975–76 Magyar Kupa (English: Hungarian Cup) was the 36th season of Hungary's annual knock-out cup football competition.

Final

See also
 1975–76 Nemzeti Bajnokság I

References

External links
 Official site 
 soccerway.com

1975–76 in Hungarian football
1975–76 domestic association football cups
1975-76